Pangboche or Panboche is a village in Khumjung VDC of Solukhumbu District in Province No. 1 of Nepal at an altitude of . It is located high in the Himalaya in the Imja Khole valley, about 3 kilometres northeast of Tengboche and is a base camp for climbing nearby Ama Dablam and trekking. It contains a monastery, famed for its purported yeti scalp and hand, the latter of which was stolen. The village is inhabited mainly by Sherpas, and Sungdare Sherpa, a native of the village, had the record for summiting Everest five times in the Sherpa climbing history and in the world history of mountaineering in 1989. The Pangboche school was built by Sir Edmund Hillary's Himalayan Trust in 1963. North of the village is the Dughla lake and pass.

See also
Solukhumbu District
Province No. 1
Nepal
Khumjung
Pangboche Hand

References

External links
Photograph

Populated places in Solukhumbu District
Khumbu Pasanglhamu